Ghost Empire is the ninth studio album by German metalcore band Caliban, released on 24 January 2014 through Century Media Records. The album entered the German Media Control Charts at number 7, becoming Caliban's first top 10 album.

Track listing

Credits 
Writing, performance and production credits are adapted from the album liner notes.

Personnel 
Caliban
 Andreas Dörner – lead vocals
 Marc Görtz – lead guitar
 Denis Schmidt – rhythm guitar, clean vocals
 Marco Schaller – bass, backing vocals
 Patrick Grün – drums

Guest musicians
 Bastian Sobtzick (Callejon) – vocals on "nebeL"
 Christoph Koterzina (Callejon) – vocals on "Good Man"
 Matt Heafy – vocals on "Falling Downwards"

Additional musicians
 Benny Richter – keyboards, additional vocals
 Marcel Neumann (We Butter the Bread with Butter) – additional keyboards
 Christoph Koterzina (Callejon) – backing vocals
 Neberu – group shouts

Production
 Benny Richter – production, recording (at B.B.Serious Studios only)
 Marc Görtz – production, recording (at Nemesis Studios only)
 Marcel Neumann (We Butter the Bread with Butter) – co-production of "Chaos – Creation", "Wolves and Rats", "Cries and Whispers", "Who We Are", "My Vertigo"
 Dominic Paraskevopoulos – recording (drums only)
 Klaus Scheuermann – mixing
 Olman Viper – mastering

Artwork and design
 Christopher Lovell – artwork
 Thomas Böcker – graphic design
 Sandra Muequin – photography

Studios 
 B.B.Serious Studios – recording
 Nemesis Studios – recording
 LEVEL3ENTERTAINMENT – recording (drums only)
 Hertwerk/nullzweistudios – mastering

Release history

Charts

References

External links 
 
 Ghost Empire at Century Media

Caliban (band) albums
2014 albums